Trepca ( / Trepča) may refer to:

 Trepča Mines, an industrial complex in Mitrovica, Kosovo
 KB Trepça, a basketball club in Mitrovica
 KF Trepça, a football club in Mitrovica founded in 1932
 KF Trepça'89, a football club in Mitrovica founded in 1989
 FK Trepča, a former football club founded in 1932 in Mitrovica which split into two, becoming KF Trepça and FK Partizan Kosovska Mitrovica
 Trepča, Montenegro, a village in Montenegro